Abbots Deuglie is a hamlet in Perth and Kinross, Scotland. Glenfarg Reservoir lies just to the west of the village, and was built in 1912.

References

Villages in Perth and Kinross